Niphona arrogans is a species of beetle in the family Cerambycidae. It was described by Pascoe in 1862. It is known from Borneo, the Philippines and Malaysia.

Subspecies
 Niphona arrogans philippinensis Breuning, 1980
 Niphona arrogans arrogans Pascoe, 1862

References

arrogans
Beetles described in 1862